Harland Goff Wood (September 2, 1907 – September 12, 1991) was an  American biochemist notable for proving in 1935 that animals, humans and bacteria fixed carbon from carbon dioxide in the metabolic pathway to succinate.
(Previously CO2 fixation had been thought to occur only in plants and a few unusual autotrophic bacteria.)

Awards and honours

Wood was a recipient of the National Medal of Science.
He was on the President's Science Advisory Committee under Presidents Lyndon B. Johnson and Richard Nixon.
He was also a member of the National Academy of Sciences, a member of the American Academy of Arts and Sciences, and of the Biochemical Society of Japan.
He was also first director of the Department of Biochemistry at the School of Medicine and Dean of Sciences, Case Western Reserve University.

Chronology 
 1907:  born in Delavan, MN, to Inez Goff and William Clark Wood
 1931: B.A., Macalester College
 1935: Ph.D. Iowa State University
 1936-1943: taught Bacteriology at Iowa State University
 1943-1946: taught Physiology at the University of Minnesota
 1946-67:  director of the Department of Biochemistry at the School of Medicine, Case Western Reserve University

References 

1907 births
1991 deaths
Macalester College alumni
University of Minnesota faculty
Case Western Reserve University faculty
Princeton University faculty
American biochemists
Members of the United States National Academy of Sciences
National Medal of Science laureates
Presidents of the International Union of Biochemistry and Molecular Biology